Greg Woodcroft (27 August 1970 – 17 April 2015) was a Canadian wrestler. He competed in the men's freestyle 52 kg at the 1996 Summer Olympics.

References

1970 births
2015 deaths
Canadian male sport wrestlers
Olympic wrestlers of Canada
Wrestlers at the 1996 Summer Olympics
Sportspeople from Hamilton, Ontario